
Year 790 (DCCXC) was a common year starting on Friday (link will display the full calendar) of the Julian calendar. The denomination 790 for this year has been used since the early medieval period, when the Anno Domini calendar era became the prevalent method in Europe for naming years.

Events 
 By place 

 Byzantine Empire 
 September – The Armeniac Theme, located in northeastern Asia Minor (modern Turkey), revolts against Empress Irene, and declares the 19-year-old Constantine VI sole ruler of the Byzantine Empire. Other themes follow its example, and imprison their strategoi. Constantine sends his iconoclast general Michael Lachanodrakon, to ensure that the Armeniacs (his closest supporters) take an oath. Irene is confined and imprisoned in her palace at Constantinople; all her eunuchs are exiled. 

 Europe 
 Alcuin, Anglo-Saxon missionary, returns (after an 8-year absence) to England. During his stay at the Carolingian court of King Charlemagne in Aachen, he has educated his sons Charles, Pepin and Louis. Alcuin revises the church liturgy and the Bible, and is responsible for an intellectual movement within the Frankish Kingdom.

 Britain 
 King Æthelred I returns to Northumbria, and is restored to the throne after living in exile for 11 years. His rival Osred II is deposed, forcibly tonsured, and exiled to the Isle of Man. Æthelred then faces a rebellion by another rival, named Eardwulf. The latter is captured, and hanged outside the gates to Ripon Abbey. The body is taken into the abbey, where Eardwulf recovers and escapes to exile. 
 King Offa of Mercia takes control of East Anglia. King Æthelberht II mints his own coins, in defiance of his overlord (approximate date).

 Asia 
 Cambodia begins to break away from the Sumatra-based kingdom Srivijaya, as a 20-year-old Cambodian prince, who claims descent from the rulers of Funan, is consecrated in eastern Cambodia with the title Jayavarman II. In the next 10 years he will extend his powers north into the Mekong Valley (modern Vietnam). 

 By topic 
 Religion 
 Irish monks (known as the Papar), possibly members of a Hiberno-Scottish mission, supposedly reach Iceland in hide-covered coracles, and begin settlements (approximate date). However, the evidence for this is scant.
 Angilbert, Frankish diplomat (primicerius palatii)  of King Charlemagne, is made abbot of Saint-Riquier (Northern France).
 Joseph is consecrated Syriac Orthodox Patriarch of Antioch

Births 
 Athanasia of Aegina, Byzantine noblewoman, adviser and saint (approximate date)
 Cyngen ap Cadell, king of Powys (Wales)
 Fātimah bint Mūsā, Muslim saint (d. 816)
 Íñigo Arista, king of Pamplona (approximate date)
 Leo IV, pope of the Catholic Church (d. 855) 
 Li He, Chinese poet (d. 816)
 Lu Tong, Chinese poet (d. 835)
 Musa ibn Musa al-Qasawi, Muslim military leader (d. 862)
 Ramiro I, king of Asturias (approximate date)

Deaths 
 Fujiwara no Otomuro, Japanese empress consort (b. 760)
 Thecla of Kitzingen, saint and abbess
 Torson, Frankish count of Toulouse (or 789)

References